Crete is a large island in Greece and may also refer to:

Historical 
 Ancient Crete 
 Battle of Crete
 Byzantine Crete
 Crete and Cyrenaica, Roman province
 Emirate of Crete
 Ottoman Crete 
 Venetian Crete
 Cretan State

Places in the United States
 Crete, Illinois
 Crete-Monee High School
 Crete, Indiana
 Crete, Nebraska
 Crete, an unincorporated town in Sargent County, North Dakota

Other uses 
 Crete (mythology), the name of several figures from Greek mythology
 Crete, a 2004 non-fiction book by Barry Unsworth
 Sea of Crete
 University of Crete

See also 
 
 Crête, a surname
 Cretan
 Crete Senesi, area of the Italian region of Tuscany
 La Crete, Alberta, Canada
 Hyundai Creta, a subcompact crossover SUV named after the Crete island